Răzvan Avram (born 12 September 1986 in Bucharest, Romania) is a Romanian footballer who plays for Liga III club CS Afumați.

Honours
CS Afumați
Liga III: 2020–21, 2021–22

References

External links
 

Footballers from Bucharest
1986 births
Living people
Romanian footballers
Association football midfielders
CS Brănești players
CS Gaz Metan Mediaș players
FC Brașov (1936) players
ACS Foresta Suceava players
CS Afumați players
Liga I players
Liga II players